Sir Thomas Englefield (also known as Inglefield) (c. 1455 – 3 April 1514) was Speaker of the House of Commons.

He was born, probably in Englefield in Berkshire, around 1455, the son of John Englefield whose family had been Lords of the Manor there for many generations. His father died while he was quite young and his grandfather, Robert Englefield, had him educated in law at the Middle Temple.

He was created a Knight of the Bath on the marriage of Prince Arthur in 1501. He held land on the Welsh border, notably in Worcestershire where he became a magistrate (JP) in 1493. He was returned to Parliament as knight of the shire (MP) for Berkshire in 1497 and 1510 and on both occasions elected Speaker of the House.

He had married Margery, daughter of Sir Richard Danvers with whom he had two sons, Richard, who died young and Thomas, his heir and the father of the Catholic politician, Sir Francis Englefield.

References

History of Parliament ENGLEFIELD, Sir Thomas (1455–1514) of Englefield, Berks

1450s births
1514 deaths
Year of birth uncertain
People from Englefield, Berkshire
Knights of the Bath
Speakers of the House of Commons of England
Members of the Parliament of England for Berkshire
English MPs 1497
English MPs 1510